Fearless is a 2007 young adult science fiction novel by British author Tim Lott. The novel follows the life of Little Fearless as she rebels against the tyrannical "Controller" in the City Community Faith boarding school.

External links
The Guardian Review

2007 British novels
Walker Books books
British science fiction novels